Frolikha is a rural locality (a village) in Ustretskoye Rural Settlement, Syamzhensky District, Vologda Oblast, Russia. The population was 7 as of 2002.

Geography 
Frolikha is located 25 km west of Syamzha (the district's administrative centre) by road. Anikovskaya is the nearest rural locality.

References 

Rural localities in Syamzhensky District